John Vincent Garza (born March 13, 1955 in Herlong, California) is a Republican former one-term member of the Texas House of Representatives from District 117 in Bexar County, Texas. Garza has been employed in housing development and sales for most of his working career.

Garza was named "Freshman Legislator of the Year" by the Hispanic Republican Conference for the 82nd Legislature in 2011.

Background

Garza was born into the military family of retired United States Air Force Staff Sergeant Arthur and Maria D. Garza and traveled extensively in his early years. In 1967, the family returned to its Westside San Antonio home.

Garza graduated in 1973 from John F. Kennedy High School in the Edgewood Independent School District of Bexar County.  He attended the University of Denver in Denver, Colorado, from which he received his bachelor's degree in Mass Communication in 1977. He married Debra A. Garza in 1980 and has reared five children, John Zachariah, Jacqueline, Isaiah, Rebekah and Hannah.

Garza has had a lengthy career in housing and real estate; he has held several executive positions in his business and sales career which dates back to the 1980s.

District 117
Garza's District 117 is among the most rapidly growing parts of Bexar County. It encompasses the far west and southwest portions of Bexar County, including the cities of San Antonio, Helotes, Von Ormy, Lytle, and the unincorporated community of Macdona. The district also includes Lackland Air Force Base, University of Texas at San Antonio, Texas A&M University–San Antonio, and Palo Alto College.

Garza was defeated in the 2012 general election after only one term in office by the Democrat Philip Cortez, who regains this seat in 2017 after a two-year absence. Garza subsequently failed in a comeback attempt in the March 4, 2014 Republican primary for House District 117. He lost the nomination to Rick Galindo, a San Antonio businessman who received 2,372 votes (64.6 percent) to Garza's 1,300 votes (35.4 percent). Galindo then narrowly unseated Cortez in the November 4 general election. In 2016, Cortez regained the position by defeating Galindo.

Election history

82nd Texas Legislature
Garza was one of forty freshmen legislators in the 82nd Texas Legislature. He was one of six Hispanic Republicans serving in the House from 2011 to 2013 and was a founding member of the House Hispanic Republican Conference.

Garza served on the House committees of Business and Industry and Land and Resource Management.

Garza in his one term in office authored or co-authored more than thirty-five bills dealing primarily with property tax reform, rural and suburban water rights, election integrity, greater accountability in government, and home owner association reform.

Unsuccessful race for county commissioner

In the general election held on November 8, 2016, Garza ran unsuccessfully for the Bexar County Precinct 1 commissioner's post. He was defeated by the incumbent Democrat Sergio "Chico" Rodriguez, a brother of former U.S. Representative Ciro Rodriguez of Texas's 23rd congressional district.

References

1955 births
Living people
People from Lassen County, California
Politicians from San Antonio
Republican Party members of the Texas House of Representatives
John F. Kennedy High School (Texas) alumni
University of Denver alumni
American politicians of Mexican descent
Hispanic and Latino American state legislators in Texas
21st-century American politicians
American Christians